This is a list of Swiss universities and other higher education institutions according to the size of their student population recognized by the Federal Higher Education Act, HEdA.

Universities and higher education institutions by size

Notes and references

See also

 Education in Switzerland
 Science and technology in Switzerland
 List of colleges and universities by country
 List of colleges and universities
 List of universities in Switzerland

External links
 Official portal of Swiss universities
 All Swiss university programmes
 KFH Rector' Conference of the Swiss Universities of Applied Sciences (KFH)
 The State Secretariat for Education and Research

Universities
Switzerland
Swiss universities by enrollment